In mathematics, the effective topos is a topos introduced by , based on Kleene's notion of recursive realizability, that captures the idea of effectivity in mathematics.

References

 

 
 

Topos theory